Aq Owlar (also Romanized as Āq Owlar and Āq Evler; also known as Agavlar, Agawlar, Āqevlar, Meryān, Meryān va Āqevlar, and Now‘adī) is a village in Kuhestani-ye Talesh Rural District, in the Central District of Talesh County, Gilan Province, Iran. At the 2006 census, its population was 181, in 50 families.

Language 
Linguistic composition of the village.

References 

Populated places in Talesh County

Azerbaijani settlements in Gilan Province

Talysh settlements in Gilan Province